Johnius amblycephalus, the bearded croaker, is a marine fish native to the Indian and Pacific Oceans.

References

External links
 Fishes of Australia : Johnius amblycephalus

Sciaenidae
Marine fish of Northern Australia
Fish described in 1855